The 1984 USL season was the United Soccer League's first and only full season.

History
The creation of Ingo Krieg, owner of the Jacksonville Tea Men, the United Soccer League formally announced its existence on February 1, 1984.  The roots go back to Krieg's frustration over the direction taken by the second division American Soccer League which was declining after a period of overexpansion and financial excesses.  Krieg proposed the creation of a financially sound league.  In late January 1984, three ASL teams, the Dallas Americans, Detroit Express and Jacksonville Tea Men informed the ASL that they intended to move to the USL for the upcoming season.  When the league announced its formal creation on the first of February, it added to the list of teams by including one in Oklahoma City and another in North Carolina.  By the end of February, the list of teams had solidified with Detroit dropping out and Buffalo and Fort Lauderdale joining.  Bill Burfeind was named league commissioner  On March 18, 1984, the league announced a final line-up of nine teams in three divisions.  The season would run from May 12 through August 15.

The season went fairly smoothly for a recently founded league, but the playoffs began with considerable confusion.  The last week of July, league officials announced that the top team in each division would make the playoffs, for a total of three teams.  The two teams with the next highest total points would play a single wild card game to determine the fourth team in the playoffs.  Then the team with the highest number of points would play the team with the lowest in one semifinal and the middle two teams would play in the other semifinal.  However, on Friday, August 17, two days before the first playoff games, league officials changed the format.  They announced that Oklahoma City, which had topped the league with 127 points would play the winner of the wild card game, and not the Buffalo Storm which had the lowest number of points.  Then the Storm owner, Sal DeRosa, announced that all games between his team and the Fort Lauderdale Storm would take place in Florida because of the low attendance at Buffalo home games.

Fort Lauderdale Sun owner, Ronnie Sharp was forced to sell his team shortly after winning the 1984 championship, because of his involvement in a drug smuggling operation. Entertainment Investors, Inc., which was mostly made up of a group of doctors that used to sit together at Strikers' games, took over control of the Sun.

League standings

Northern Division

Southern Division

Western Division

Playoffs

Wild card

Semifinal 1

Semifinal 2

Final

Honors
 MVP: Jose Neto
 Leading goal scorer: Jose Neto
 Leading goalkeeper: Jim Tietjens
 Rookie of the Year: Mark Schwartz
 Coach of the Year: Gary Hindley
 Playoffs MVP: Mark Schwartz
 Executive of the Year: Peter Kane

Points leaders

References

External links
 United Soccer League (RSSSF)
 The Year in American Soccer - 1984

	

United Soccer League (1984–85) seasons
2
Soccer in Florida